Education in Cyprus is overseen by the Ministry of Education, Sports and Youth.

The education system is divided into pre-primary education (ages 3–6), primary education (ages 6–12), secondary education (ages 12–18) and higher education (ages 18+). Full-time education is compulsory for all children aged between 5 and 15.  State-provided schooling including higher education is paid for by taxes.

There is also a parallel system of accredited independent schooling, and parents may choose to educate their children by any suitable means. Private school and university fees are not usually covered by the state.

Higher education often begins with a four-year bachelor's degree. Postgraduate degrees include master's degrees, either taught or by research, and the doctorate, a research degree that usually takes at least three years. Universities require accreditation by the Cyprus Agency of Quality Assurance and Accreditation in Higher Education in order to issue degrees.

Primary education

In the 2017-2018 academic year, there were 334 primary schools with 56,700 students and 3,980 teachers.

Secondary education

Higher education
Higher, or tertiary education is provided by a network of state and private universities and colleges. Private universities were first accredited in 2005 and require a special licence to operate and award degrees. This was set out in the 2005 Private Universities law.

Currently the following universities have a licence by the Ministry of Education and Culture to issue academic degrees:

Public Universities

 University of Cyprus
 Open University of Cyprus
 Cyprus University of Technology

Private Universities
 European University Cyprus
 Frederick University
 Neapolis University
 University of Central Lancashire Cyprus (UCLan Cyprus)
 University of Nicosia
 Philips University

Private Institutions of Tertiary Education 

 A.C. American College
 ACC AKADEMIA COLLEGE
 Aigaia School of Art and Design
 Alexander College 
 Arte Music Academy
 Atlantis College
 Casa College
 CBS – College of Business Studies
 C.D.A. College
 Church of Cyprus - School of Theology
 City Unity College Nicosia
 College of Tourism & Hotel Management
 Cyprus College
 Cyprus International Institute of Management 
 Cyprus School of Molecular Medicine
 Frederick Institute of Technology 
 Global College
 Institute of Professional Studies (IPS), UCLan Cyprus
 Intercollege 
 InterNapa College
 KES College
 Larnaca College
 Ledra College
 Mesoyios College
 Neapolis College
 P.A. College
 Susini College 
 The CTL EuroCollege
 The Cyprus Academy of Art
 The Cyprus Institute
 The Cyprus Institute of Marketing
 The Limassol College - T.L.C.
 The Philips College
 Vladimiros Kafkaridis School of Drama

Public Institutions of Tertiary Education 

 The Higher Hotel Institute of Cyprus 
 The Cyprus Forestry College
 The Mediterranean Institute of Management 
 The Police Academy 
 The School for Tourist Guides 
 The Public School of Higher Vocational Education and Training (MIEEK)

Technical and Vocational Education and Training (TVET) 
Technical and vocational training (TVET) addresses multiple demands of an economic, social and environmental nature by helping young people and adults to develop the skills they need for employment, decent work and entrepreneurship, promoting equitable, inclusive and sustainable economic growth, and supporting transitions to green economies and environmental sustainability.

The Human Resource Development Authority of Cyprus (HRDA) is the body in charge of managing training funds in Cyprus. The system relies on contributions paid by all employees, with the exception of the self-employed and government workers. By law the Human Resource Development Levy rate cannot exceed 1% of the emoluments paid to each employee. In practice, the levy rate is 0.5% of payroll, with a monthly cap of €4,533 (Regulation 509/2012).

The HRDA issues grants to employers for approved training as well as allowances to trainees and financial assistance for obtaining training equipment. The HRDA subsidizes 80% of the cost of training, rising to 100% for ‘high-priority multi-company training programmes’.

See also
 List of Ministers of Education and Culture of the Republic of Cyprus
 Secondary education in Cyprus
 List of schools in Cyprus
 List of universities and colleges in Cyprus

References

Sources

External links
 Ministry of Education and Culture
 Educational Itinerary of Cyprus